The Top 14 is a professional rugby union club competition that is played in France. Created in 1892, the Top 14 is at the top of the national league system operated by the French National Rugby League, also known by its French initialism of LNR. There is promotion and relegation between the Top 14 and the next level down, the Rugby Pro D2. The fourteen best rugby teams in France participate in the competition, hence the name Top 14. The competition was previously known as the Top 16.

The league is one of the three major professional leagues in Europe (along with the English Premiership and the United Rugby Championship, which brings together top clubs from Ireland, Wales, Scotland, Italy and South Africa), from which the most successful European teams go forward to compete in the European Rugby Champions Cup, the pan-European championship which replaced the Heineken Cup after the 2013–14 season.

The first ever final took place in 1892, between two Paris-based sides, Stade Français and Racing Club de France, which were the only teams playing the competition that year, with the latter becoming the inaugural champions. Since then, the competition has been held on an annual basis, except from 1915 to 1919—because of World War I—and from 1940 to 1942—because of World War II. Each year, the winning team is presented with the Bouclier de Brennus, a famous trophy awarded from 1892. Toulouse is the most successful club in the competition with 21 titles.

History

Early years 
The first competition was held in 1892, as a one-off Championship game between the Racing Club de France and Stade Français. The Racing Club defeated Stade Français by four points to three to win the first ever title, though the stadistes got their revenge the following year in a repeat of the final. The match official for that first final was Pierre de Coubertin. Stade Français would go on to win a number of titles thereafter. The 1897 and 1898 series were awarded on a points system after a round-robin. Although the competition was called the French Championship, entry was confined to Parisian clubs. The 1899 season was the first to include non-Parisian clubs. The final, which was also played outside of Paris, in Le Bouscat (a suburb of the city of Bordeaux), was won by Stade Bordelais (from Bordeaux).

For the following decade the Championship final would usually end up being contested by the Racing Club, Stade Français and Stade Bordelais, with Stade Bordelais winning five titles during this period. At this time the final was usually held in various stadia around Paris with the exception of 1903 and 1909, when it was held in Toulouse, as SOE Toulouse and Stade Toulousain were finalists respectively. The competition was then won by a number of different clubs before World War I, with teams like FC Lyon, Stade Toulousain, Aviron Bayonnais and USA Perpignan claiming their first titles.

Between the wars 
Due to WWI, operations were suspended for a number of years. In its place, a competition known as the Coupe de l'Espérance was held, which involved mostly young boys who had not been drafted. The competition was held four times, but is not normally considered a full championship. The normal competition returned for the 1920 season, and Stadoceste Tarbais became the first post-war champions, defeating the Racing Club de France in the final. During the 1920s Stade Toulousain initiated its now famous rugby history, winning five Championships during the decade (Stade's very first feat took place in 1912 when they were crowned champions without losing a single game throughout the season: the team was nicknamed "la Vierge Rouge" — the Red Virgin). USA Perpignan also won two championships (their 1925 final victory was actually a second match, as a previous final had ended in a nil-all draw).

During the 1930s the Championship final was held only in Bordeaux or Toulouse. The 1930 Championship final, won by Agen over US Quillan, was the first to go into extra time. It would also see Toulon and Lyon OU win their first championship games. During the latter part of the decade, RC Narbonne, CS Vienne and Perpignan all won titles, and Biarritz Olympique were champions in both 1935 and 1939.

Postwar 
After WWII the Championship final returned to Paris, and was played at Parc des Princes for the next four seasons. The competition during the 1940s was won by a number of different teams, though Castres won in 1949, and then again in 1950. FC Lourdes would become a dominant club during the 1950s, winning five Championships, and another in 1960.

SU Agen would go on to win three titles during the 1960s. Lourdes were also the champions of the 1968 season, but due to the May 1968 events, the final was played three weeks behind normal schedule. At the end of regulation time the score was tied at 6–6, and then 9–9 after extra time. Lourdes were declared champions because they had scored two tries to Toulon's none and also because there was no time to schedule a third final as the French national team were about to leave on a tour to New Zealand and South Africa.

Although Béziers won their first Championship in the 1961 season, it would be the 1970s which would see a golden era for the club, as they would win ten Championships between 1971 and 1984, as well as being runners-up in 1976. Also in the mid 1970s, after being held in Toulouse, Lyon and Bordeaux in recent years, the Championship final was taken to Parc des Princes, Paris, on a permanent basis. During the rest of the 1980s, Toulouse were the dominant team, winning the Championship in 1985, 1986 and 1989. Toulon won in 1987 (and were runners-up in 1985 and 1989), and Agen won in 1988 (and were runners-up in 1984 and 1986).

Into the professional era 
The first match of the 1990s went into extra time, as the Racing Club de France defeated Agen, winning their first Championship since 1959. Bègles, Toulon, Castres and Toulouse would win the following finals. The 1990s also saw the game of rugby union go professional following the 1995 Rugby World Cup in South Africa. This also led to the establishment of the European Heineken Cup. Including their 1994 victory, Toulouse won four championships in succession. For the 1998 season, the final was moved to Stade de France, the newly constructed national stadium. The final, played in front of 78,000, saw Stade Français win their first Championship since 1908.

Rising popularity 

The competition saw an enormous rise in popularity in 2005–06, with attendance rising to an average of 9,600, up by 25% from 2004–05, and numerous sellouts. On 15 October 2005, Stade Français drew a crowd of 79,502 at Stade de France for their home match against Toulouse; this broke the previous French attendance record for a regular-season league match in any sport (including football) by over 20,000. That record was broken on 4 March 2006, when Stade Français drew 79,604 to a rematch of the 2004–05 final against Biarritz at Stade de France. It was broken again on 14 October 2006 with 79,619 as the same two opponents met, and a fourth time on 27 January 2007, with 79,741 for another Stade Français-Toulouse match.
During the regular season 2010–2011, the average attendance per match reached 14,184.

In 2011, Canal+ indicated that evening matches were being watched by between 800,000 and 850,000 viewers while afternoon matches were watched by around 700,000 viewers.

In recent years, numerous foreign players have joined Top 14 teams.

Changes afoot 
In August 2016, LNR released a strategic plan outlining its vision for French rugby through the 2023 Rugby World Cup. The plan includes significant changes to the top levels of the league system, although the changes were more dramatic for Pro D2 than for the Top 14. Changes affecting the Top 14 are:
 Starting with the 2017–18 season, the only club to be automatically relegated from Top 14 will be the bottom club on the league table. That club will be replaced by the Pro D2 champion.
 From 2017–18, the second-from-bottom team on the Top 14 table will enter a playoff with the Pro D2 runner-up, with the winner taking up the final Top 14 place.

On 13 March 2017, the Top 14 was rocked by the announcement that Racing 92 and Stade Français planned to merge into a single club effective with the 2017–18 season. Stade Français players soon voted almost unanimously to go on strike over the proposed merger, and within days LNR held an emergency meeting to discuss the Paris clubs' plans. The clubs announced on 19 March that the planned merger had collapsed.

Controversy
The 1993 French Rugby Union Championship was won by Castres who beat Grenoble 14-11 in the final, in a match decided by an irregular try accorded by the referee.

A try of Olivier Brouzet was denied to Grenoble and the decisive try by Gary Whetton was awarded by the referee, Daniel Salles, when in fact the defender Franck Hueber from Grenoble touched down the ball first in his try zone. This error gave the title to Castres.

Daniel Salles admitted the error 13 years later.

Jacques Fouroux conflict with the Federation cry out conspiracy.

Current clubs

Notes

Current venues

Economic strength of the clubs 
Over recent years, the Top 14 has seen the economic strength of its clubs rise significantly. Aided by high attendance, large television rights contracts, public subsidies and the rise of the euro exchange rate, Top 14 clubs have seen their overall spending budget increase significantly. In 2011–2012, four clubs had a budget over 20 million euros: Toulouse (33), Clermont (24), Racing Métro [now Racing 92] (22), Stade Francais (21).
The average salary of players in the Top 14 was estimated to have risen, in 2010, to $153,700 (compared to $123,000 in the English Premiership). The wealth of the Top 14 clubs has led them to attract a large number of international players, and to build teams with more strength in depth (in 2011, Top 14 clubs could have as many as 45 players, compared to 33 for Leicester Tigers, 2010 Premiership winner).

Two recent changes in regulation threatened to limit this economic growth. First, the French government repealed the law known as DIC (Droit à l'Image Collectif) on 1 July 2010. This law had allowed all member clubs in French professional sports organisations to treat 30% of each player's salary as image rights. This portion of player salaries was thus exempt from France's high payroll and social insurance taxes.

Second, to control the growth of club spending, the LNR introduced a salary cap in the Top 14 in the 2010–11 season. Under the provisions of the cap, team payrolls were limited to €8 million. This is in addition to an existing requirement that wage bills be no more than 50% of a team's turnover. However, the €8 million cap was 5% greater than the highest official wage bill in the 2009–10 Top 14, and was well above the English Premiership's then-current £4 million cap. For the 2011–2012 season, the LNR raised the salary cap to €8.7 million. Since then, the cap has risen still further, to €10 million starting in 2013–14 and continuing through 2015–16. Additionally, the cap now excludes youth players whose salaries are no more than €50,000.

At the same time as LNR announced the salary cap, it also announced new rules requiring a minimum percentage of French players on club rosters. Players qualifying under these rules, referred to in French as JIFF (joueurs issus des filières de formation, loosely translated as "academy-trained players"), must have been registered with the FFR for at least five years before turning 23, or have spent three seasons in an FFR-approved training centre before turning 21. Original plans were to require 50% JIFFs in 2010–11, but protests from leading clubs led to a reduction to 40% for that season. Initially, the 50% quota was to be met in 2011–12, and 60% in 2012–13, but a compromise with the clubs saw no change to the limit until 2013–14, at which time it increased to 55%. Additionally, effective in 2015–16, LNR was allowed to fine clubs that did not have a minimum of 12 JIFFs in their matchday squads. These regulations, however, do not consider eligibility to play for the French national team. For example, although the Armitage brothers (Delon, Steffon and Guy) all represented England internationally, they qualified as JIFF because of their tenure in Nice's youth setup. On the other hand, recent France international Jérôme Thion, despite being a native and lifelong resident of France, did not qualify because he switched from basketball to rugby too late in his youth.

While the most visible critics of the change in policy were wealthy club owners such as Mourad Boudjellal of Toulon and Max Guazzini of Stade Français, concern had been growing in French rugby circles that some smaller clubs might fold completely. Bourgoin only avoided a bankruptcy filing in 2009 by players agreeing to large wage cuts, and Brive, whose 2009–10 wage bill was €7.2 million, announced that they would cut their budget by 40% for the 2010–11 season. Following the 2009–10 season, Bourgoin were denied a professional licence by LNR due to their ongoing financial issues, but the French Rugby Federation (FFR) reversed this decision on Bourgoin's appeal. Montauban were relegated at the end of the same season after filing for bankruptcy.

By the 2012–13 season, the internationalization of the Top 14 had reached such a state that Irish rugby journalist Ian Moriarty, who has had considerable experience covering the French game, asked the rhetorical question, "Has there ever been such a large disconnect between France's club teams and the international side they are supposed to serve?" He cited the following statistics from that season to make his point:
 Clermont and Toulon, who were set to play in the Heineken Cup final within days of Moriarty's piece, fielded a total of eight France-qualified starters out of a possible 30 in their Heineken Cup semifinal matches. Of these eight players, only four were regulars in the French national team.
 During the 2012–13 Top 14, none of the top three points scorers were French, and only three of the top 10 try scorers were French.
 Of the players who made the most appearances in their respective positions during that season, only three (out of 15) were French.
 National team coach Philippe Saint-André suggested that several "foreign" players—meaning players who were born and largely developed outside the country—could make their debuts for France during the team's 2013 summer tour. Moriarty specifically named five such players as potential Test newcomers.

While the JIFF policy worked on one level—the number of foreign players recruited into the Top 14 went from 61 for 2011–12 to 34 for 2014–15—clubs quickly found a way around the rules. Many clubs dispatched scouts to identify top teenage prospects in other countries, and then enrolled them in their academies to start the JIFF qualification process. For example, the 59 players in the 2015–16 Clermont youth squad included 17 from nine countries outside of France. A more fundamental problem was identified in 2015 by Laurent Labit, at the time backs coach of the club now known as Racing 92. In an interview with British rugby journalist Gavin Mortimer, Labit pointed out that France has no organized team sport in its educational system at the primary level—children must join an outside club in order to play sports. Only at age 15 do youths have the opportunity to attend special sporting schools, but places in such institutions are limited. In turn, this means that most young French players are technically well behind their counterparts in many other countries, most notably Commonwealth members and Ireland.

Format and structure

The Top 14 is contested by fourteen professional rugby union clubs throughout France. The domestic season runs from August through to June. Every club contests 26 games during the regular season – over 26 rounds of competition. For many years, the season was split into two-halves for scheduling purposes, with both halves scheduled in the same order, with the team at home in the first half of the season on the road in the second. However, this strict order has since been abandoned, although the season is still loosely divided into halves. Throughout the August–June competition there are breaks during the season, as there are also European club fixtures (from 2014–15, Champions Cup and Challenge Cup) that are played during the rugby season, as well as the Six Nations Championship, in which many top French players are involved, as well as a few players from the other European powers. The schedule may be adjusted somewhat in World Cup years; this was especially true in the 2007–08 season, which ran up against the 2007 Rugby World Cup in France. That season, the Top 14 played on all of the Six Nations weekends and on some of the Heineken Cup weekends.

The Top 14 is organized by the Ligue Nationale de Rugby (LNR), which runs the professional rugby leagues within France (Top 14 and Rugby Pro D2). There is a promotion and relegation system between the Top 14 and Pro D2. Starting with the 2017-18 season, only the lowest-placed club in the table after the regular season is automatically relegated to Pro D2. The playoff champion of Pro D2 is automatically promoted, while the next-to-last Top 14 club and the playoff runner-up of Pro D2 play each other to determine which club will be in Top 14, and which will be in Pro D2 the following season. Starting with the 2009–10 season, the Top 14 knock-out stages consist of three rounds. The teams finishing third through to sixth in the table play quarter-finals, hosted by the No. 3 and No. 4 teams. The winners then face the top two seeds in the semi-finals, whose winners then meet in the final at the Stade de France (although the 2016 final was instead held at the Camp Nou in Barcelona, Spain due to a scheduling conflict with France's hosting of UEFA Euro 2016). In previous seasons, only the top four teams qualified for semi-finals. Unlike many other major rugby competitions (such as the Gallagher Premiership, Mitre 10 Cup, Currie Cup, and from 2009–10 the Celtic League/Pro12), the Top 14 has traditionally held its semi-finals at neutral sites.

Regardless of the playoff format, the top six teams had qualified for the following season's Heineken Cup in the final years of that competition, and since 2013–14 a minimum of six teams qualify for the European Rugby Champions Cup. Before the 2009–10 season, the seventh-place team also qualified if a French club advanced farther in that season's Heineken Cup than any team from England or Italy. While the European qualification system was changed for 2009–10, the normal contingent of six Top 14 teams in the Heineken Cup did not change. The default number of French teams in the Champions Cup has remained at six, but the method for a seventh French team to qualify has changed from performance in the previous European season to a post-season playoff. For the inaugural Champions Cup in 2014–15, this playoff involved the seventh-place teams from both England and the Top 14; in future years, the same two sides will be joined by one Pro12 side.

Previously in the first phase of the then-Top 16, the teams were divided into two pools of eight. This was followed by a second phase, in which the eight highest-ranked teams played for semi-final spots and the bottom eight teams battled against relegation. In 2004–05, the top division consisted of a single pool of 16 teams, with the top four teams advancing to a knockout playoff at the end of the season to determine the champion. From 2005–06 through 2008–09, the top division was run with a single pool of 14 teams, again with a season-ending four-team playoff. The single pool was retained for 2009–10, but the playoffs were expanded to six teams.

The LNR uses a slightly different bonus points system from that used in most other major domestic competitions. Instead of a bonus point being awarded for scoring 4 tries in a match, regardless of the match result, a bonus point is awarded to a winning team that scores 3 tries more than its opponent. This system makes two scenarios that can be seen in the standard system impossible:
 A losing team earning two bonus points. (The "offensive" bonus point, linked to the number of tries scored, can only be earned by the winning team in France.)
 Either team earning a bonus point in a drawn match. (See above for the "offensive" bonus point. The "defensive" bonus point can only be earned by a losing team.)

For 2014–15, LNR further tweaked its bonus point system. The margin of defeat that allows the losing team to earn a bonus point was reduced from 7 points to 5.

European competition
The Top 14 serves as the qualification route for French clubs in European club competition. Starting with the 2014–15 season, Top 14 teams compete in the new European club rugby competitions—the European Rugby Champions Cup and European Rugby Challenge Cup. The Champions Cup and Challenge Cup replaced the previous European competitions, the Heineken Cup and Amlin Challenge Cup.

Under the new structure, the top six teams on the Top 14 table qualify directly for the following season's Champions Cup. The seventh-placed team advances to a play-off for another Champions Cup place. In 2013–14, the play-off involved said Top 14 club and the seventh-placed club in the English Premiership. Initially, plans were for the play-off in subsequent years to also include two sides from Pro12 in the Celtic nations and Italy. Due to fixture clashes with the Top 14 season, the play-off that followed the 2014–15 season involved only one Pro12 side. Because the start of the 2015–16 European season ran up against the 2015 Rugby World Cup, the play-off was completely scrapped for that season, with the final Champions Cup place for 2016–17 instead awarded to the winner of the 2016 Challenge Cup.

In the Heineken Cup era, a minimum of six French clubs qualified for the Heineken Cup, with the possibility of a seventh depending on the performance of French clubs in the previous season's Heineken Cup and Challenge Cup.

All Top 14 clubs that do not qualify for the Champions Cup automatically qualify for the Challenge Cup. This means that all Top 14 clubs will participate in European competition during a given season.

The French clubs have had success in the European competitions. The inaugural Heineken Cup, held in the 1995–96 season, was won by Toulouse, which would eventually claim three more championships (2003, 2005 and 2010). It was not until the fifth championship game that there was no French team in the final. There have also been five occasions where the final was an all-French affair. The first three were all won by Toulouse (against Perpignan in 2003, Stade Français in 2005, and Biarritz in 2010); the other two were victories by Toulon over Clermont in 2013 and 2015.

In addition to the French success in the Heineken Cup and Champions Cup, the clubs in the lower European competitions have achieved similar results. The first four finals of the European Challenge Cup (1997–2000) were all-French affairs. Since then, however, only four French clubs (Clermont in 2007, Biarritz in 2012, Montpellier in 2016, and Stade Français in 2017) have won this competition, and French clubs in general have had less success; the revised Top 16/Top 14 format has required them to pay more attention to league games in order to avoid relegation. The now defunct European Shield, a repechage tournament for clubs knocked out in the first round of the Challenge Cup that was played for three seasons in 2003–05, was won by a French team each time.

Table

French broadcasting rights
Since the 2008-09 season, the Top 14 regular season and playoff quarter-finals and playoff semi-finals have been televised by Canal+. Between the 2008-09 season and the 2010-11 season, France Télévisions televised the playoff final, but since the 2011-12 season they and Canal+ jointly televised the playoff final.

Total wins
The following clubs have won the title:

Bold indicates clubs playing in 2022–23 Top 14 season.

Finals 1892–1995

The scores in green are links to the account of each final on the site of the professional league (LNR). In French.

Finals since 1996 (Professionalism) 

The scores in green are links to the account of each final on the site of the professional league (LNR). In French. 

Notes

Player records

Appearances

Points

Tries

See also
 Bouclier de Brennus
 European Professional Club Rugby
 Challenge Yves du Manoir
 Coupe de France
 List of Top 14 foreign players

References

External links
 Official site
 English website

 
 
France
National rugby union premier leagues
Professional sports leagues in France
1892 establishments in France
Recurring sporting events established in 1892